Guy McCoy Tormé (also known by its initials, GMT) is a British rock band, formed by Robin Guy and former Gillan members John McCoy and Bernie Tormé.

Career 
In 2005, Bernie Tormé and John McCoy are reunited again with the idea form a new band, taking advantage by the successful sales of the Gillan material published for Angel Air Records between 1997 and 2000. By 2006, with the release of Gillan's Live Edinburgh 1980 DVD, an extra videoclip from the song "Cannonball" made by GMT marked the start of the group, follow for the debut three-track EP Cannonball published on 21 August 2006. In 2007, GMT toured widely by the UK, performing at RBCS 2007 Rock and Blues Festival, in Pentrich. The next year, GMT released on 17 November Evil Twin, their first full album, with Dee Snider as guest. Between 2009 and 2011, GMT performed various shows, release the first live album Raw - Live in 2011.

Hiatus 
In late 2011, due to John McCoy's health problems, the band went on hiatus. Meanwhile, Benrie Tormé recorded and toured again as solo act, with Chris Heilmann on bass guitar and various drummers on stage, today with Ian Harris as member (including Bernie' son Eric in some shows). John McCoy worked with Tyla Gang in 2012, and Robin Guy still play as guest, more recently with Tatiana DeMaria.

Personnel
Bernie Tormé — Guitar and vocals
John McCoy — Bass
Robin Guy — drums and percussion

Discography
Cannonball (2006, EP)
Bitter & Twisted (2006)
Evil Twin (2008)
Raw - Live (2011)

External links
 Official site
 GMT performing "Rocky Road (From Dublin)"
 Interview with GMT at Hard Rock Hell Festival

British rock music groups